Northside-Westmount is a provincial electoral district in  Nova Scotia, Canada, that elects one member of the Nova Scotia House of Assembly.

In 1933, the County of Cape Breton was divided into five electoral districts, one of which was Cape Breton North, which was carved out of parts of Cape Breton Centre and Cape Breton East. In 2003, the district gained upper North Sydney as far as Balls Creek and Point Aconi. In 2013, the district was renamed Northside-Westmount and it lost the area west of Little Bras d'Or to Victoria-The Lakes and gained the area north of Highway 125 from Cape Breton South.

In the 2021 election, Northside-Westmount was the only riding to flip to the Liberals as the province went from a Liberal majority to a Progressive Conservative majority.

Members of the Legislative Assembly
This riding has elected the following Members of the Legislative Assembly:

Election results

Northside–Westmount

Cape Breton North

References

External links
 2013 riding profile

Nova Scotia provincial electoral districts
2012 establishments in Nova Scotia